Beavertown is an unincorporated community and census-designated place (CDP) in Blair County, Pennsylvania, United States. It was first listed as a CDP prior to the 2020 census.

The CDP is in southeastern Blair County, in the northeastern part of Huston Township. It is in the Morrisons Cove region of the county, on the west side of Clover Creek, between Tussey Mountain to the east and a lower, unnamed ridge to the west. Clover Creek is a northward-flowing tributary of the Frankstown Branch of the Juniata River, part of the Susquehanna River watershed.

Demographics

References 

Census-designated places in Blair County, Pennsylvania
Census-designated places in Pennsylvania